Helicidae is a large, diverse family of small to large, air-breathing land snails, sometimes called the "typical snails."

A number of species in this family are valued as food items, including Cornu aspersum (formerly Helix aspersa) the brown or garden snail, and Helix pomatia the "escargot". The biologies of these two species in particular have been thoroughly studied and documented.

Shell description 
The shells of these snails are mostly rather globular in shape. In some genera, such as Cepaea, the shells are brightly colored and patterned.

Anatomy 
The animal is capable of complete retraction within the shell. The tail is without a mucous gland or projection.

The mouth is always provided with a jaw, which is striate, ribbed, sulcate or plicate, sometimes composed of several imbricating pieces. The radula is composed of many transverse horizontal series of teeth, the centrals tricuspidate, about the size of the laterals, laterals bicuspid, or tricuspid with the interior cusp obsolete, marginals usually wider than high, short with two or three small cusps.

In the soft parts the most obvious distinction is the lack of a caudal mucous pit, and their possessing a sculptured jaw. Typically, there is a distinction in the dentition, although in some species the lateral teeth take on a pseudozonitoid appearance; even in such cases the extreme marginals in Helix remain short and very obtuse.

This family of snails is defined by the anatomical presence of a diverticulum. Some genera within this family create and use love darts as part of their mating behavior. These snails have one dart apparatus. The dart sac has no accessory sac, and contains two tubular glands, inserted at the base of the dart sac.

In this family, the number of haploid chromosomes lies between 21 and 30 (according to the values in this table).

Distribution 
The family is native to Eurasia and belongs to the Western Palearctic group.

However some species, notably Cornu aspersum, have been introduced and become established in numerous different areas worldwide.

Many accidental introductions happen because the eggs of most Helicidae are laid in the soil, and they may thus easily travel unnoticed along with landscaping plants.

Genera 

The family Helicidae contains 3 subfamilies (according to molecular phylogenetic analyses):

Subfamily Helicinae Rafinesque, 1815 
In this subfamily the glands are divided. The love dart has four blades or vanes. There are usually two penial papillae.

Tribe Allognathini 
Allognathus
Cepaea Held, 1838
Hemicycla
Iberus
Pseudotachea

Tribe Helicinini Rafinesque, 1815 
 Assyriella
 Caucasotachea
 Codringtonia
 Helix Linnaeus, 1758 - type genus
 †Megalotachea Pfeffer, 1930 
 Isaurica
 Levantina Kobelt, 1871
 Lindholmia
 Maltzanella
 :Neocrassa
 Tyrrhenaria: synonym of Helix Linnaeus, 1758
 Xeroleuca Kobelt, 1877

Tribe Otalini 
 Cantareus Risso, 1826
 Cornu Born, 1778
 Eobania P. Hesse, 1913
 Massylaea Möllendorff, 1898
 Otala Schumacher, 1817
 Rossmaessleria

Tribe Thebini
 Theba Risso, 1826

A 2022 phylogenetic analysis proposed that all groups of the Maghreb radiation belonged to a single tribe, Thebini, without support for a separate Otalini tribe. The same study proposed a new tribe, Maculariini trib. nov. containing the genus Macularia due to the wide geographic disjunction between the western Alpine Macularia and the primarily Maghrebian Thebini tribe.

Subfamily Murellinae

Tribe Murellini Hesse, 1918 
 Macularia Albers, 1850
Marmorana W. Hartmann, 1844 - This genus might actually belong to the subfamily Ariantinae and not to the subfamily Helicinae, as has been assumed until now.
Tacheocampylaea
Tyrrheniberus

Subfamily Ariantinae Mörch, 1864 
In this subfamily the glands are divided or undivided. The love darts contain two to four blades. There is only one penial papilla.
Arianta Turton, 1831
Campylaea H. Beck, 1837
Campylaeopsis A.J. Wagner, 1914
 Cattania Brusina, 1904
Causa Schileyko, 1971
Chilostoma Fitzinger, 1833
Corneola Held, 1838
Cylindrus Fitzinger, 1833
Delphinatia P. Hesse, 1931
Dinarica Kobelt, 1902
Drobacia Brusina, 1904
Faustina Kobelt, 1904
Helicigona A. Férussac, 1821
Isognomostoma Fitzinger, 1833
Josephinella F. Haas, 1936
Kollarix Groenenberg, Subai & E. Gittenberger, 2016
Kosicia Brusina, 1904
Liburnica Kobelt, 1904
Mesodontopsis Pilsbry, 1895 †
Metacampylaea Pilsbry, 1895 †
Paradrobacia H. Nordsieck, 2014 †
Pseudoklikia H. Nordsieck, 2018 †
Pseudotrizona Groenenberg, Subai & E. Gittenberger, 2016
Thiessea Kobelt, 1904
Vidovicia Brusina, 1904
Pseudochloritis C. R. Boettger, 1909

Incertae sedis 
Idiomela T. Cockerell, 1921
Lampadia

References

External links 

 
Helicoidea
Gastropod families
Taxa named by Constantine Samuel Rafinesque